Vembaneri is an agricultural village. Vembaneri is a village panchayat located in Idappadi taluk of Salem district in Tamil Nadu. It is 35 km by road west of Salem. It comes under Idappadi legislative constituency and Salem Parliament constituency. It is 12 km from Idappadi and Chinnappampatti. It is surrounded with a number of villages (Pupupalaiyam, Samuthram, Maniyakaranpalaiyam, Chettimankurichi, Dadhapuram, Konasamudram). Most of the people in the village belong to the Vanniar people. Vembaneri Village total population is 3542 and the number of houses are 952. Female population is 45.6%. Sarabanga is a river flowing in this area. Its Postal Identification Number (PIN) is 637105. 
 
Ayyanarappan Temple in Vembaneri is a very famous in that area. For every year they conducted the festival for that god in "chithirai" (the Tamil month).
 
Vembaneri Lake is one of the source for the ground level water supplier in this village, and this beautiful lake is the major source for the Vembaneri, Pupupalaiyam, Maniyakaranpalaiyam farmers.

Villages in Salem district